"Wig" is a song by American new wave band The B-52's, the third and final single from their 1986 album Bouncing Off the Satellites.

Release and promotion
The single was released to coincide with the delayed release of Bouncing Off the Satellites in the UK in 1987, a year after it had been released in the U.S.; thus "Wig" was released in the UK only and was the first single from the album there.

While the band didn't tour in support of Bouncing Off the Satellites upon its original release, due to guitarist Ricky Wilson's then-recent death, they traveled to the UK to make promotional appearances, miming to "Wig" on TV and being interviewed in magazines. The single peaked at No. 79 in the UK.

Many years later, in 2010, the band started playing "Wig" live, and a live version was included on their With The Wild Crowd! live album.

Track listing

UK 12" single: Island Records 
 "Wig" - 4:22
 "Summer of Love" - 3:58
 "Song for a Future Generation" - 4:00

UK 7" single: Island Records
 "Wig" - 4:22
 "Summer of Love" (Remix by Shep Pettibone) - 3:58

References 

1987 singles
The B-52's songs
Songs written by Fred Schneider
Songs written by Kate Pierson
Songs written by Keith Strickland
Songs written by Cindy Wilson
Song recordings produced by Tony Mansfield
Warner Records singles
Island Records singles
1986 songs
Songs released posthumously